Johannes Christian Roos (28 April 1826 in Kamp am Rhein – 22 October 1896 in Freiburg im Breisgau) was a German Roman Catholic clergyman. He was Bishop of Limburg from 1885 to 1886 and Archbishop of Freiburg from 1886 until his death ten years later.

Bibliography (in German) 
 Klaus Schatz: Geschichte des Bistums Limburg. Mainz 1983.
 Christoph Schmider: Die Freiburger Bischöfe: 175 Jahre Erzbistum Freiburg. Eine Geschichte in Lebensbildern. Freiburg i. Br.: Herder Verlag, 2002. .

Sources
 

Roman Catholic bishops of Limburg
Archbishops of Freiburg
1896 deaths
1826 births
People from Rhein-Lahn-Kreis